Crataegus austromontana, with common name Valley Head hawthorn, is a very rare species of hawthorn that is possibly extinct. It grows as a shrub or tree  in height.

Distribution
Crataegus austromontana was found in Alabama and Tennessee. The last time that a herbarium specimen was collected was in 1916.

References

austromontana
Flora of Alabama
Flora of Tennessee
Trees of the Southeastern United States
Endemic flora of the United States
Plants described in 1899
Flora without expected TNC conservation status